Shirk is a surname. Notable people with the surname include:

Amos Urban Shirk (c. 1890 – 1956), American businessman
Bill Shirk (born 1945), American escape artist
Dave Shirk, visual effects supervisor
Eugene Shirk (1901–1994), American politician
Gary Shirk (born 1950), American football player
George H. Shirk (1913–1977), American lawyer and historian
James Shirk (1832–1873), American naval officer
John Shirk (1917–1993), American football player
Ken Shirk, American triathlete and ultramarathon runner
Marshall Shirk (born 1940), American player of Canadian football
Matthew Shirk (born 1973), American lawyer
Susan Shirk (born c. 1945), American academic